Bartolo Musil is an Austrian baritone singer and composer, born in Klagenfurt.

Trained as a composer, pianist, and singer, he has been working as a musician from his early childhood. He studied at the Universities of Vienna, Salzburg and Detmold with teachers such as Walter Berry and Thomas Quasthoff. Additionally he attended private tuition and masterclasses with Jessica Cash, Edith Mathis, Cornelia Kallisch, Kurt Widmer, Rudolph Piernay, and others. At present he is coached by the belcanto experts Michael Aspinall and Gioacchino Zarrelli.

Already as a student he started receiving awards and grants, and was recently awarded the First Prize at the International Competition “Concours de la Mélodie française” in Toulouse.

Bartolo Musil's repertoire reaches from Renaissance and early Baroque up to contemporary experimental opera.
As a concert and opera singer he has sung important parts at the Chigiana Festival in Siena (Atenaide by Vivaldi, broadcast by the RAI) in the Vienna Musikverein (e.g. staged Monteverdi madrigals in the Great Hall) and Konzerthaus, the Berlin Festival, the Berlin Philharmonie (Messiah and The Creation), the Holland Belcanto Festival, the Festival of Early Music in Innsbruck, the festival Carinthischer Sommer festival, the Stephaniensaal Graz, the Cathedrals of Berlin and Vienna, the Vienna Kammeroper, Neue Oper Wien (Le Balcon by Eötvös), and many others.

When he, after only two weeks of preparation, took on the title role of Monteverdi’s L'Orfeo in a big production of the German festival “Antikenfestspiele” in Trier, he achieved a particular success with the audience and press, and was listed in “Who’s Hot” in the magazine “Opera Now”.

Bartolo Musil has worked with the Venice Baroque Orchestra, conducted by Andrea Marcon, the Wiener Klangforum, the Ensemble Kontrapunkte, the Moscow Symphony Orchestra, the SWR-Orchester, the Orpheus Kammerorchester, the Savaria Baroque Orchestra, Armonio Tributo, conducted by Lorenz Duftschmid, and directors such as Pet Halmen and Achim Freyer.  Song recitals, radio and CD productions and his cabaret duo "" complete his activities.

In 2006 his first solo recital CD "Virtuosity - il Baritono Barocco" was published by the Italian label Bongiovanni.

As a composer Bartolo Musil has written commissioned works for several important venues, such as the Vienna Musikverein and Konzerthaus, the festival Carinthischer Sommer, the Jeunesses Musicales, etc., and was also awarded several prizes.

Research and Teaching 
Bartolo Musil is an artistic researcher and has completed an artistic doctorate at the University of Music and Performing Arts, Graz. 
In 2015 he was appointed as a University Professor for Voice by the University Mozarteum in Salzburg.

Trivia 
Twentieth century writer Robert Musil and Austrian orientalist Alois Musil are relatives of Bartolo Musil.

External links
  (official website as a singer)
  (documentation of his work as a composer)

Living people
20th-century Austrian male singers
21st-century Austrian male singers
Austrian male composers
Austrian composers
Musicians from Klagenfurt
Year of birth missing (living people)